Joseph-François-Félix Garnier de Saint-Antonin was a French Navy officer. He served in the War of American Independence, earning a membership in the Society of Cincinnati and the Order of Saint Louis.

Biography 
Saint-Antonin was born to a family from Aix-en-Provence. He joined the Navy as a Garde-Marine on 18 Septembern 1749. 

Saint-Antonin was promoted to Lieutenant on 15 January 1762, and to Captain on 4 April 1777.  He was first officer on the 64-gun Provence. He took part in the Battle of Grenada on 6 July 1779, and took over command of Provence when her captain, Champorcin, was killed. He was then given command of the 64-gun Fantasque, which he captained at the Siege of Savannah.

In 1780, he commanded the frigate Lutine for a mission in the Eastern Mediterranean. In 1781, he was at Malta and Toulon.

He retired from the Navy on 29 August 1783.

Sources and references 
 Notes

References

 Bibliography
 
 

External links
 

French Navy officers
1717 births
1792 deaths